Nodjialem Myaro (born 5 September 1976 in N'Djamena, Chad) is a French handball player. She won silver at the 1999 World Championship and gold in 2003. She also competed at the 2000 and 2004 Summer Olympics.

With Metz she won 5 times the French championship.

Since 2021 she is also a member of the Executive committee of the EHF as representative of Women's Handball Board.

References

1976 births
Living people
French female handball players
French sportspeople of Chadian descent
Black French sportspeople
Olympic handball players of France
Handball players at the 2000 Summer Olympics
Handball players at the 2004 Summer Olympics
People from N'Djamena